Revere is a city  in Clark County, Missouri, United States. As of the 2020 census, its population was 76. It is part of the Fort Madison–Keokuk, IA-MO Micropolitan Statistical Area.

Geography
Revere is located in northern Clark County three miles from the Missouri-Iowa state line.
The Atchison, Topeka and Santa Fe Railroad passes through the community.

History
Founded on October 22, 1887, by the Santa Fe Railroad, Revere was "probably named in honor of Paul Revere." During the period prior to 1900, Revere flourished as an intermediate stop for the railroad. In 1898, Revere was incorporated as a city in the 4th class of Missouri. 

 

In 1898, J.H. Talbott of Luray started the Revere Current, a weekly newspaper that consisted of five pages of world and local news including advertisements, train schedule and local markets. Circulation closed on July 18, 1901, when Talbott left for law school.

Located at the former site of the Revere Methodist Church, Ar-Del Park was dedicated on May 30, 1946, as a memorial to Revere natives John Arnold Wallace and Delmar Brown, who died serving their country during World War II.  A large boulder with a plaque dedicated to all Clark County veterans is located in the park.

On July 26, 2011, the United States Postal Service announced plans to consider closing the Revere post office as part of a nationwide restructuring plan. On May 9, 2012, it was announced that a new strategy would preserve the nation's smallest post offices, reversing the earlier plan.

Demographics

2010 census
As of the census of 2010, there were 79 people, 36 households, and 24 families residing in the city. The racial makeup of the city was 98.7% White, 1.3% from other races. Hispanic or Latino of any race were 1.3% of the population.

There were 36 households, of which 16.7% had children under the age of 18 living with them, 58.3% were married couples living together, 5.6% had a female householder with no husband present, and 33.3% were non-families. 33.3% of all households were made up of individuals, and 2.8% had someone living alone who was 65 years of age or older. The average household size was 2.19 and the average family size was 2.71.

In the city, the population was spread out, with 21.5% under the age of 20, 2.5% from 20 to 24, 19.0% from 25 to 44, 43.0% from 45 to 64, and 13.9% who were 65 years of age or older. The median age was 49 years. For every 100 females, there were 113.5 males. For every 100 females age 18 and over, there were 106.5 males.

Education

Revere High School was started in 1923 with a single student, Lula Riley.  In 1925, a new building was dedicated for grades K-12.  In 1988, the graduating class had two students.  After several years of declining enrollment the final high school class graduated in 2002 with five students.  The building was then used for K-8 students, with grades 9-12 attending Clark County R-1 high school in Kahoka. Continued declining enrollment led to a vote in April 2012 that resulted in the decision to close the school and annex it to the Clark County R-1 school district effective July 1, 2012.

Despite one of the smallest high school enrollments in the state of Missouri, the purple and white Bulldogs fielded four Missouri State High School Athletic Association state-qualifying teams.  Baseball teams from 1977, 1981 and 1982 and the 1997 girls basketball team reached the state playoffs.

References

Cities in Clark County, Missouri
Fort Madison–Keokuk, IA-IL-MO Micropolitan Statistical Area
Cities in Missouri